Hermaea paucicirra is a species of sacoglossan sea slug, a shell-less marine opisthobranch gastropod mollusk in the family Hermaeidae.

Distribution
This species is known to occur in West Africa, Spain, and the western Mediterranean.

References

Hermaeidae
Gastropods described in 1953
Taxa named by Alice Pruvot-Fol